Ready Is Always Too Late is the second studio album by English singer Sinéad Harnett, released on 21 May 2021 by Thairish Limited. It follows her 2019 debut album, Lessons in Love. In an interview with Rated R&B, Harnett explained the meaning behind the title. "The inspiration for that title came from track one, which was about me really feeling someone and he didn’t feel the same. He would say things like, ‘You know, we’re not really there yet. Let’s wait until we’re ready.’ From one kind of quite light-hearted, rejection song, came the theme. I’ve been grafting on my sound and really on myself as a person, because I feel like until you gain that confidence and that self-assured tone to your life it’s really quite hard to be like, ‘this is the artist that I am, listen to me,’” she said.

Track listing

References

2021 albums